Shields, England may refer to two cities in Tyne and Wear:

 North Shields
 South Shields